National Conservative Party is the name of several political parties: 
 National Conservative Party of South Africa
 National Conservative Party (South Africa) (1954–1957)
 National Conservative Party (Cuba)
 Latvian National Independence Movement (1988–1990s)

See also
 Catholic-National Conservative Party in Bohemia (1911–1919)
 Catholic-National Conservative Party in Moravia (1896–1919)
 National Liberal and Conservative Party, the name adopted by the Conservative Party of Canada in 1920
 List of conservative parties
 List of conservative parties by country